Muriel Picton  is an Australian former cricket player, who captained the Australia national women's cricket team on four occasions. She was born on 31 October 1930 in Singleton, New South Wales and made her Test debut against New Zealand in 1961.
She played her last test against England in 1969. In 7 matches overall she scored 111 runs and took 8 wickets with her off breaks. She played state cricket for New South Wales Women.

Picton was appointed a Member of the Order of Australia (AM) in the 2022 Queen's Birthday Honours for "significant service to cricket as a player, administrator and coach".

References

Further reading

 

1930 births
Living people
Australia women Test cricketers
Members of the Order of Australia
New South Wales Breakers cricketers
Cricketers from New South Wales